Ignace Beck was an Indian politician . He was a Member of Parliament, representing Lohardaga, Bihar in the Lok Sabha the lower house of India's Parliament as a member of the Jharkhand Party.

References

External links
Official biographical sketch in Parliament of India website

Lok Sabha members from Bihar
Jharkhand Party politicians
1896 births
Year of death missing
Lists of Indian politicians
India MPs 1957–1962